Jach'a Pata (Aymara jach'a big, pata step,  "big step", Hispanicized spelling Jachcha Pata) is a  mountain in the Cordillera Real in the Andes of Bolivia. It is situated in the La Paz Department, Los Andes Province, Batallas Municipality. Jach'a Pata lies south of Jisk'a Pata, west of Janq'u Uyu, north of Wila Lluxi and north-east of Warawarani.

See also
 Kunturiri
 Q'ara Quta
 List of mountains in the Andes

References 

Mountains of La Paz Department (Bolivia)